Adrian Negrău (born 17 March 1968) is a Romanian former football striker. He was part of Steaua's team that reached the 1989 European Cup final, in which he was an unused substitute.

Honours
Steaua București
Divizia A: 1988–89
Cupa României: 1988–89
European Cup runner-up: 1988–89
Kispesti Honvéd
Nemzeti Bajnokság I: 1992–93

References

External links

1963 births
Living people
Romanian footballers
Association football forwards
Liga I players
Liga II players
Nemzeti Bajnokság I players
Nemzeti Bajnokság II players
Budapest Honvéd FC players
FC UTA Arad players
FC Steaua București players
FC Bihor Oradea players
Budapesti VSC footballers
Szombathelyi Haladás footballers
Békéscsaba 1912 Előre footballers
Romanian expatriate footballers
Expatriate footballers in Hungary
Romanian expatriate sportspeople in Hungary
Sportspeople from Arad, Romania